Eremophila hamulata is a flowering plant in the figwort family, Scrophulariaceae and is endemic to Western Australia. It is an erect, woody shrub with sticky branches, narrow, hooked leaves and hairy mauve-purple flowers.

Description
The four stamens are enclosed by the petal tube. Flowering time is mainly from August to October.

Taxonomy and naming
Eremophila hamulata was first formally described by Bevan Buirchell and Andrew Brown in 2016 and the description was published in Nuytsia. The specific epithet (hamulata) is derived from the Latin word hamatus meaning "with hooks" or "hooked", referring to the hooked end of the leaves.

Distribution and habitat
This eremophila is found in scattered locations between McDermid Rock and Boorabbin Rock in the Coolgardie biogeographic region usually growing near granite outcrops or near creeks in woodland.

Conservation status
Eremophila hamulata has been classified as "Priority One" by the Government of Western Australia Department of Parks and Wildlife, meaning that it is known from only one or a few locations which are potentially at risk.

References

hamulata
Eudicots of Western Australia
Plants described in 2016
Taxa named by Bevan Buirchell
Taxa named by Andrew Phillip Brown